Adelaide (minor planet designation: 525 Adelaide) is an S-type asteroid belonging to the Flora family in the Main Belt. It was discovered 21 October 1908 by Joel Hastings Metcalf.

Previously, the object A904 EB, discovered 14 March 1904 by Max Wolf, had been named 525 Adelaide but was subsequently lost. When it was rediscovered 3 October 1930 by Sylvain Arend as  1930 TA, it was named 1171 Rusthawelia. Some 28 years passed before the two objects were realized to be the same. 1930 TA retained the name Rusthawelia (and discovery credited to Arend); the name 525 Adelaide was reused for the object 1908 EKa.

Another confusion occurred in 1929, one year before Arend's discovery, when American astronomer Anne Sewell Young thought to have found long-lost "Adelide", when in fact she mistook the asteroid for comet 31P/Schwassmann–Wachmann that had a very similar orbital eccentricity.

References

External links
 
 

Flora asteroids
Adelaide
Adelaide
S-type asteroids
SU-type asteroids (Tholen)
19040314
19081021
19301003